Dott Services Limited, commonly referred to as Dott Services, is a Ugandan engineering and construction company. It is one of the leading companies in the engineering and construction fields, in the African Great Lakes Region, as of December 2021. Headquartered in Kampala, Uganda's capital city, Dott Services is active in Uganda, Tanzania, South Sudan and DR Congo,

Overview
Dott Services was established in 1994 by four engineers who graduated from the same engineering college in India: (a) Venugopal Rao (Executive Director, Dott Services) (b) Maheswara Reddy, (Managing Director, Dott Services) (c) Prasad Reddy and (d) Komi Reddy. Each of the founders/directors own 25 percent of the company stock. As of 2021 the company employed an estimated work force of between 500 and 1,000 people.

Ownership
The business is privately owned by the families of the four original founders. The table below illustrates the shareholding in the company stock.

Governance
The executive chairman of the company is Venugopal Rao, an Indian national. Maheswara Reddy, another Indian national, is the managing director. The contracts manager at the company is Engineer Jamesone Olonya, a Ugandan national.

Projects
This is a partial listing of past and current construction projects, where Dott Services Limited is or was the lead contractor:

1. Iganga–Tirinyi–Kamonkoli–Mbale Road: The tarmacking of this  road to class II bitumen standard, with shoulders, culverts and drainage channels, was ongoing as of July 2020.

2. The Ishaka–Kagamba Road: This  road was converted to bitumen surface in 2016.

3. Jinja-Kamuli Road: The road was resurfaced in 2007, in preparation for the 2007 Commonwealth Heads of Government Meeting in Kampala, Uganda and as of 2021, is under preparation for resurfacing.

4. Kampala–Mityana Road: The , Muduuma–Mityana section of the Kampala–Mityana Road, was converted to class 2 bitumen standard, by Dott Services Limited, between 2008 and 2012.

5. The Hoima-Kiziranfumbi-Kabaale Road, and Kafu-Masindi Road are both contracted to Dott Services Limited, as part of Uganda's Oil Roads.

6. Dott Services is contracted to build/repair/improve several roads in Tanzania, including (a) Korogwe–Mkumbara–Same Road (b) Kawawa–Nduoni–Marangu Mtoni Road (c) Mkuu–Tarakea Road and (d) Marangu–Kilacha–Rombo Road''.

Recent developments
In 2021, Dott Services Limited was selected to construct a number of roads inside the Democratic Republic of the Congo, linking that country to Uganda, to the east. The roads, totaling , in length, include the Kasindi–Beni–Butembo Road and the Bunagana–Rutshuru–Goma Road.

See also
 Economy of Uganda
 ROKO Construction Company

References

External links
 Official Website

Construction and civil engineering companies of Uganda
Construction and civil engineering companies established in 1994
Kampala
Nakawa Division
1994 establishments in Uganda